Cape Hawaii is a headland of Wrangel Island. Administratively it belongs to the Chukotka Autonomous Okrug, Russian Federation. 

History
Cape Hawaii was named in August 1867 by Thomas Long, the captain of American whaling bark Nile, after the Hawaiian Islands, where his ship was based. On 23 August 1881 the headland was the first point of Wrangel Island sighted by Lieutenant Robert M. Berry on USS Rodgers during the search for the Jeannette.  

In the 1960s, a radar station of the Soviet Air Defence Forces was built on Cape Hawaii. The military personnel lived in it autonomously with supplies delivered by air. They rarely visited neighboring Ushakovskoye village, and only following an invitation of local authorities or in connection with significant events. In 1992 the military radar installation at Cape Hawaii was closed.

See also
 List of research stations in the Arctic
 Waring Point

References

External links
Military on Wrangel Island (in Russian)
Medvedev establishes environmental buffer zone around Wrangel Island

Headlands of Chukotka Autonomous Okrug
Wrangel Island
Chukchi Sea